Pueblo Nuevo is a municipality in the Estelí Department of Nicaragua.

Municipalities of the Estelí Department